Ivan Romanovich Mamakhanov (born 26 February 1996) is an Armenian football player. He also holds Russian citizenship.

Club career
Mamakhanov made his professional debut in the Russian Football National League for FC Torpedo Armavir on 12 July 2015 in a game against FC Zenit-2 St. Petersburg.

References

External links
 Player page on the FNL website

1996 births
People from Ivanteyevka
Living people
Armenian footballers
Armenia youth international footballers
Armenia under-21 international footballers
Ulisses FC players
FC Armavir players
Association football defenders
FC Ararat Moscow players
Sportspeople from Moscow Oblast